Johannes Cornelis de Klerk (born ) is a South African professional rugby union player for Canon Eagles in the Japanese Top League. His regular position is lock.

Career

Youth

De Klerk grew up in Pietersburg (now Polokwane) and was selected to represent Limpopo at the Under-16 Grant Khomo Week in 2007.

After high school, De Klerk moved to the Western Cape and was linked up with Cape Town-based side . He made nine appearances for the  side during the 2012 Under-21 Provincial Championship, helping the side to third spot on the log to qualify for the semi-finals.

Maties

De Klerk was included in the  squad for the 2013 Varsity Cup competition.

Maties finished third in the competition to qualify for the semi-finals, but were unable to beat their Cape Town rivals , losing the match 8–20.

Western Province / Stormers

Shortly after the conclusion of the 2014 Varsity Cup, De Klerk joined the  squad for the 2014 Vodacom Cup. He made his first class debut by starting in their 65–29 victory over Kenyan invitational side, .

In 2015, he featured prominently for the Vodacom Cup side.

Canon Eagles

De Klerk joined Japanese Top League side Canon Eagles prior to the 2018–19 Top League.

References

South African rugby union players
Living people
1991 births
People from Polokwane
Rugby union locks
Stormers players
Western Province (rugby union) players
Rugby union players from Limpopo
Yokohama Canon Eagles players
Toyota Industries Shuttles Aichi players